The 2016 Tour Down Under was a road cycling stage race that took place between 19 and 24 January in and around Adelaide, South Australia. It was the 18th edition of the Tour Down Under and was the first event of the 2016 UCI World Tour. The defending champion was Rohan Dennis.

Simon Gerrans took the lead after the third stage of the race. He maintained his lead through the remaining three stages to win the race for the fourth time in his career. Australian cyclists won every stage of the 2016 Tour Down Under; this was the second time this had occurred in the race's history.

Participating teams 
As the Tour Down Under is a UCI World Tour event, all eighteen UCI World Teams were invited automatically and obliged to enter a team in the race.

Route 
The route of the 2016 Tour Down Under was announced at the beginning of July 2015 and centred around the city of Adelaide in South Australia. There were six mass-start road stages and no time trials. The day before the start of the Tour, there was a flat criterium race, the People's Choice Classic, which took place in Rymill Park and which was suited for the sprinters. It was won by Caleb Ewan in a sprint finish. The first five stages of the race itself included at least some climbing, with none of them particularly suited to the sprinters. The first two stages of the Tour both included climbs early in the stage and hilly circuits at the end. The third and fourth stages had climbs towards the end of each day's racing, with opportunities for attacks. The fifth stage finished with two climbs of Willunga Hill, which had been decisive in previous editions of the race. The final stage was another criterium around the centre of Adelaide.

Pre-race favourites 

The Tour Down Under comes at the very beginning of the cycling season. Many riders begin their seasons at the race; they therefore are not at their peak form. Some riders also choose to start later in the season. In 2016, these included Chris Froome, Tom Boonen ( and Alberto Contador. Others chose to begin their seasons at the Tour de San Luis, which takes place at the same time as the Tour Down Under in Argentina. These included Vincenzo Nibali, Nairo Quintana and Peter Sagan (Tinkoff). Despite the many prominent riders who did not appear at the race, the race director described himself as "delighted" with the field of riders who took to the startline.

The key stage was expected to be the penultimate stage, finishing on Old Willunga Hill. The third and fourth stages, which had climbs towards the finish of the race, were also expected to have the potential to affect the overall result. Three of the main favourites for the race were Australians. These were Rohan Dennis and Richie Porte (both ) and Simon Gerrans. Dennis was the defending champion, having beaten Porte by two seconds in the 2015 race; Gerrans had won the race on three former occasions, in 2006, 2012 and 2014. While Porte and Dennis had an advantage on the uphill finishes, Gerrans's strong sprint gave him the opportunity to win bonus seconds. Other riders with a chance at a strong overall result included Geraint Thomas (Sky) and Louis Meintjes.

The strongest sprinters in the race included Caleb Ewan, Wouter Wippert, Giacomo Nizzolo and Matteo Pelucchi. They were expected to feature strongly on the first and last stages.

Stages

Stage 1

Stage 2

Stage 3

Stage 4

Stage 5

Stage 6

Classification leadership table

References

External links 

 

Tour Down Under
Tour Down Under
Tour Down Under
Tour